J. W. Conner was a member of the Wisconsin State Assembly.

Biography
Conner was born on July 28, 1870, in Preston County, West Virginia. Later, he moved to Piatt County, Illinois attended Drake University and what is now Iowa State University. He eventually settled in Douglas County, Wisconsin.

Assembly career
Conner was elected to the Assembly in 1916 and 1918. He was a Republican.

References

People from Preston County, West Virginia
People from Piatt County, Illinois
People from Douglas County, Wisconsin
Republican Party members of the Wisconsin State Assembly
Drake University alumni
Iowa State University alumni
1870 births
Year of death missing